Kobra Khan is a fictional character in the Masters of the Universe franchise. He is a member of the Evil Warriors, and a cross between a man and a cobra, who has the power to spray a "sleep mist" from his hood which immediately renders his opponent unconscious (in some later incarnations he instead sprays poisonous venom). Although generally recognized as a member of Skeletor's Evil Warriors, in many media he serves a dual allegiance to both Skeletor and the later introduced King Hiss of the Snake Men.

Character history

Original figure
Kobra Khan was introduced into the Masters of the Universe toy line in 1984 as part of the line's third wave of figures. 

The figure's special feature is to spray water. The figure's head is removable, and the hollow torso can be filled with water so that when the head is back in place, it can be pushed down to spray water from its mouth. The figure came with an orange version of the laser pistol that first came with the Zodac figure. 

The figure was originally released with the tag-line "Evil Master of Snakes.” Later on in the line, when the Snake Men were introduced, later releases of Kobra Khan packaged him with the Snake Men logo, changing his tag to "Evil henchman of the Snake Men.” He was generally portrayed as a go-between between Skeletor and King Hiss. His exact loyalties sometimes varied in different versions of the franchise, but generally he was portrayed as being more aligned to Skeletor's warriors (although he would change sides as it suited him).

Filmation animated series
As with a number of third wave figures, Kobra Khan is incorporated into the accompanying Filmation cartoon when it returned for a second season. Whereas many of the Evil Warriors were portrayed as bumbling henchmen in the Filmation version, Kobra Khan is generally portrayed in a darker, more serious manner. 

He is usually paired with Webstor (another third wave figure introduced into the cartoon series around the same time) and the two of them are often seen to work as a duo. They are first paired in the episode "Disappearing Dragons" which portrays Khan as the leader of the two. He is portrayed as a sly, scheming and sullen character, capable of taking on numerous opponents at once with his sleep mist. Lou Scheimer voiced him with a low, whisper-like, hissing voice. 

In the episode "The Good Shall Survive" he demonstrates the power to elongate his arms to grasp his opponent before spraying them. This ability was never mentioned before nor since, be it in the Filmation cartoon or in any other incarnation of the franchise, although to note is that a later Snake Man character, Sssqueeze, had stretchable arms with which he trapped victims.

The final produced episode of the series, "The Cold Zone", focuses exclusively on Kobra Khan and his race, the Reptons. We learn in this episode that the Reptons inhabit a quiet underground kingdom beneath a stone pyramid, and are a peaceful race who regard Khan as a traitor since he left them to join Skeletor's forces. The plot features Khan seeking the help of He-Man and his companions in relighting the furnace that heats the Reptons' kingdom, which has been extinguished by an unknown intruder. As the plot unfolds, it turns out that it was in fact Khan who extinguished the flame, and the Repton's ruler, King Pythos, has offered to grant the crown of the Reptons to whoever can expose the guilty party. Therefore, Khan has concocted an elaborate scheme to frame He-Man for the crime so that he can become ruler of the Reptons upon exposing He-Man as guilty. Other members of the Reptons seen in this episode are King Pythos, an unnamed Chancellor, and the court jester, Scales, who reveals Khan as the true criminal.

2002 series
Kobra Khan was re-used in the 2002 relaunch of the Masters of the Universe toy line and cartoon series. A major change to his character is that his fangs spit acidic venom instead of sleep mist, and his figure was packaged as "Venom Spitting Khan". Khan seems able to vary the intensity of his venom as he sees fit; from a painful irritant, blinding opponents eyes without inflicting permanent damage, to a powerful acid that is able to instantly melt metal.

He is introduced in the episode "Snake Pit", in which he is presented as a dangerous criminal who escapes from the Royal Palace dungeons after years of imprisonment. He flees to Snake Mountain where he pledges allegiance to Skeletor, but his real plan is to delve deep beneath Snake Mountain to find the Snake Pit, the portal to the void in which his ancestors, King Hiss and the Snake Men, are imprisoned. His scheme is foiled by He-Man and Zodak before he can succeed, but he does manage to free General Rattlor, and the two of them resurface in the final episode of the show's first season, "Council of Evil" Part 2 in which Khan makes a deal with Evil-Lyn that he will free her and the other Evil Warriors from the Masters' jail providing she assists him and Rattlor in freeing King Hiss. She keeps her part of the bargain, and in the episode "Rise of the Snake Men part 1" the Snake Men are finally released. While Khan is accepted by the Snake Men in their new conquest of Eternia, he is constantly treated with contempt by the leaders, purely because he is a descendant and not one of their original army, and also because of his smaller size. King Hiss however does seem to take a shine to Khan and seems to be quite impressed by his loyalty. 

Khan's personality is largely different from his 1980s incarnation. Although he still retains a portion of his independent and scheming nature, he is presented with a more youthful personality. Khan is also rather squeamish, especially at the thought of eating victims whole like the other Snake Men, and acts like a groveling bootlicker to King Hiss, doing his best to win favor in his King's eyes and outdo his rival, General Rattlor.

Nonetheless, Khan appears to be a better fighter than Rattlor against the cosmic warrior, Zodak. While Rattlor is easily defeated by Zodak, Khan swiftly overpowers the cosmic warrior. Also in the episode "Snake Pit" he proves himself an extremely effective fighter against He-Man and the Masters.

Reception
Kobra Khan was ranked the 5th smartest Masters of the Universe Villain by Screen Rant. Kobra Khan was voted No.5 in The 12 Coolest Masters of the Universe Action Features by Topless Robot. Comic Book Resources listed the character as He-Man: Eternia's 15 Mightiest Villains.

References

Villains in animated television series
Extraterrestrial supervillains
Fictional characters introduced in 1984
Fictional humanoids
Fictional snakes
Masters of the Universe Snake Men
Fictional anthropomorphic characters
Fictional soldiers
Masters of the Universe Evil Warriors
Male characters in animated series